The 1978 Hardie-Ferodo 1000 was the 19th running of the Bathurst 1000 touring car race. It was held on 1 October 1978, at the Mount Panorama Circuit just outside Bathurst. The race was open to cars eligible to the locally developed CAMS Group C touring car regulations with three engine capacity based classes.

The race was won by Peter Brock, his third win, and Sports Sedan racer Jim Richards, his first. The pair drove a Holden Dealer Team Holden Torana to a single lap victory over  another Torana, that of Allan Grice and Formula 5000 driver John Leffler. Third was the first of the Ford Falcons, that of veteran Murray Carter and New Zealand open wheel great Graeme Lawrence. Richards became the first New Zealander to win the race and it was the Holden Dealer Teams third win.

Class structure

Class A
The 3001 - 6000cc class consisted entirely of compact muscle cars including V8 Holden Toranas and Ford Falcons.

Class B
The 2001 – 3000cc class featured Mazda RX3, Ford Capri, and BMW 3.0Si.

Class C
The Up to 2000cc class saw a mix of Alfa Romeo Alfetta and GTV 2000, Ford Escort RS2000, Holden Gemini, Toyota Celica, Triumph Dolomite and VW Golf.

Hardies Heroes
1978 saw the introduction of the Hardies Heroes Top 10 runoff (now referred as the Top Ten Shootout) for pole position, devised by race broadcaster Channel 7 and the Australian Racing Drivers Club (ARDC) for extra television time on the day before the race. With official qualifying now held on the Friday (previously held on the Saturday before the race from 1963-1977), the runoff was held on the Saturday morning with Seven showing half-hour highlights around Australia later in the afternoon. Drivers drew the order in which they would run out of a hat with the order being Allan Grice, Peter Brock, Jack Brabham, Dick Johnson, Derek Bell, Bob Morris, Garth Wigston, Colin Bond, John French and lucky last Allan Moffat. Each driver had two, one lap runs to set a quick time, though the second lap was optional.

Morning showers meant that the track was damp during the first run and with most cars on wet weather tyres, times reflected this with Grice recording a first up 2:38.2 and Brock a 2:35.6. No other driver was then able to lap better than 2:27 until Allan Moffat went out and ignoring the puddles (plus a little help from team members on top of the mountain who radioed in that the track was now dry enough for slicks), ran a 2:21.59 lap while hitting  on Conrod Straight. Moffat's time in his 5.8 L V8 powered Ford Falcon Cobra was some 6 seconds faster than anyone else had managed and 4.8 seconds under his own Group C Touring Car lap record set in 1977. Taking Moffat's cue that the track was now dry enough for quick times, Brock then ran a 2:20.006 in his HDT Torana which was enough to give him his second Bathurst pole in succession and his third overall (his pole time would not be beaten until 1982). Moffat's team mate Colin Bond then joined Brock on the front row with a 2:20.871 lap (0.865 slower than Brock), and while Moffat then tried to respond, he had to settle for the inside of the second row with a time of 2:21.597. Bob Morris, the fastest in official qualifying with a 2:21.7 would start in fourth after equaling his time in the runoff, with his team mate Derek Bell rounding out the top 5, though he was some 2.8 seconds slower than Morris. John French in the second Bryan Byrt Ford Falcon was the slowest in the runoff, his time some 10.2 seconds slower than Brock's pole time and 4.6 seconds slower than team mate Dick Johnson.

* Bob Morris was fastest qualifier going into Hardies Heroes in his Holden LX Torana SS A9X Hatchback with a 2:21.7 lap, and although he equalled this time in the shootout, he fell to 4th on the grid.* Dick Johnson made the first of 20 consecutive starts in the Top 10 runoff at Bathurst. He finished the shootout in 6th position in his Ford XC Falcon GS500 Hardtop.* Peter Brock's pole time of 2:20.006 would stand as the fastest pole time at Bathurst until Allan Grice recorded a 2:17.501 to claim pole in a Holden VH Commodore SS in 1982.* Triple Formula One World Champion Jack Brabham qualified for his only top 10 shootout at Bathurst in a 4-Door version of the A9X Torana, finishing in 8th position. The Brabham name would not appear in another Bathurst Top 10 runoff until his son David qualified 8th in 1993 in a Holden VP Commodore.* The top 10 consisted of 6 Holden Torana's and 4 Ford Falcons. While the Torana's were spread over 5 different teams, the Falcons only came from Moffat Ford Dealers and Bryan Byrt Ford.

Results

Statistics
 Provisional Pole Position - #7 Bob Morris - 2:21.7
 Pole Position - #05 Peter Brock - 2:20.006
 Fastest Lap - #1 Allan Moffat - 2:22.0 (lap record)
 Average Speed - 149 km/h
 Race Time - 6:45:53.9

References

External links
 CAMS Manual reference to Australian titles
 www.touringcarracing.net
 race results
 Autopics Bathurst images
 Official Programme, 1978 Hardie-Ferodo 1000

Motorsport in Bathurst, New South Wales
Hardie-Ferodo 1000